The 1898–99 French Rugby Union Championship  was won by SBUC  that defeated Stade Français in the final.

The final was played between the team winner of the "provincial tournament" and the best of club from Paris, Stade Bordelais that defeated S.O.E. Toulousain (3–0) and le FC Lyon par forfait, and the Stade Français from Paris.

Preliminary round 
Le Stade Français won the first division championship of Paris on Racing Club de France thanks to a 5–3 victory. Follow l'Olympique, the Cosmopolitan Club, the Ligue Athlétique and l'Union Athlétique du Primer Arrondissement.

The ranking of second division was : 1. Association Vélocipédique d'Amateurs (6pts) ; 2. Sporting Club Amateurs (3pts), Association Sportive Internationale (3pts) ; 4. Athlétique (0pt).

The FC Lyon finish first in city of Lyon tournament beating Lycée Ampère.

Final

External links 
 Compte rendu de la finale de 1899, sur lnr.fr
 Photo des finalistes, sur finalesrugby.com

References 
 La Presse février, mars, avril 1899

1899
France
Championship